Mehdiabad (also Romanized as Mehdīābād; also known as Kārīz Dīvāneh) is a village in Salehabad Rural District, Salehabad County, Razavi Khorasan Province, Iran. At the 2006 census, its population was 317, in 85 families.

References 

Populated places in   Torbat-e Jam County